Marko Todorović (Serbian Cyrillic: Марко Тодоровић; born April 19, 1992) is a Montenegrin professional basketball player who plays for Ningbo Rockets of the Chinese Basketball Association (CBA). He is a 6 ft 11 in (2.11 m) tall power forward-center.

Professional career
Todorović played basketball at the junior level with the youth teams of KK Joker in Montenegro and Joventut Badalona in Spain. He played with Joventut Badalona's second team, Prat Joventut, in the Spanish 3rd Division, from 2010 to 2012. He also played with the senior men's team of Joventut Badalona, in the Spanish ACB League, from 2011 to 2012.

Todorović joined Barcelona Bàsquet before the start of the 2012–13 season.

For the 2014–15 ACB season, Todorović was loaned from FC Barcelona to Bilbao Basket. He was named ACB Player of the Month on March 31, 2015.

On July 14, 2015, Todorović signed a three-year contract with the Russian club Khimki. On April 1, 2016, he was, again, loaned to Bilbao Basket for the rest of the 2015–16 season.

On September 28, 2018, Todorović returned to Divina Seguros Joventut for a second stint, signing a one-year deal.

On August 17, 2019, Todorović was reported to have signed with Tianjin Pioneers.

On August 13, 2021, he has signed with Real Betis Baloncesto of the Liga ACB.

On November 17, 2021, he has signed with Beijing Royal Fighters of the CBA.

NBA draft rights
On June 27, 2013, Todorović was drafted 45th overall by the Portland Trail Blazers of the National Basketball Association. On July 10, 2013, the Trail Blazers traded his rights to the Houston Rockets as part of a trade for Thomas Robinson. It was reported on July 31, 2019, the Houston Rockets renounced their draft rights to Todorović.

Montenegrin national team
Todorović was a member of the junior national teams of Montenegro. He played at the 2011 FIBA Europe Under-20 Championship. With the senior Montenegrin national basketball team, Todorović played at the 2017 EuroBasket.

References

External links
Marko Todorović at acb.com 
Marko Todorović at draftexpress.com
Marko Todorović at euroleague.net
Marko Todorović at eurobasket.com
Marko Todorović at fiba.com
Marko Todorović at fibaeurope.com

1992 births
Living people
2019 FIBA Basketball World Cup players
BC Khimki players
Bilbao Basket players
CB Prat players
Centers (basketball)
FC Barcelona Bàsquet players
Joventut Badalona players
Liga ACB players
Montenegrin expatriate basketball people in Russia
Montenegrin expatriate basketball people in Spain
Montenegrin men's basketball players
Portland Trail Blazers draft picks
Power forwards (basketball)
Real Betis Baloncesto players
Sportspeople from Podgorica